The SY postcode area, also known as the Shrewsbury postcode area, is a group of 25 postcode districts in England and Wales, within 32 post towns. These cover most of Shropshire (including Shrewsbury, Oswestry, Ludlow, Bucknell, Whitchurch, Bishop's Castle, Craven Arms, Church Stretton, Ellesmere, Lydbury North and Llanymynech), north Powys (including Montgomery, Newtown, Welshpool, Caersws, Llanbrynmair, Llanfechain, Llanfyllin, Llandinam, Llanidloes, Llansantffraid, Machynlleth and Meifod), and north Ceredigion (including Aberystwyth, Borth, Bow Street, Tregaron, Talybont, Ystrad Meurig, Llanrhystud and Llanon), plus small parts of south Cheshire (including Malpas) and north Herefordshire, and very small parts of Gwynedd and Wrexham County Borough.



Coverage
The approximate coverage of the postcode districts:

|-
! SY1
| SHREWSBURY
| Shrewsbury (north and town centre)
| Shropshire
|-
! SY2
| SHREWSBURY
| Shrewsbury (east)
| Shropshire
|-
! SY3
| SHREWSBURY
| Shrewsbury (south and west), Bayston Hill
| Shropshire
|-
! SY4
| SHREWSBURY
| Baschurch, Bomere Heath, Nesscliffe, Shawbury, Wem
| Shropshire
|-
! SY5
| SHREWSBURY
| Atcham, Cressage, Criggion, Condover, Minsterley, Pontesbury, Ratlinghope, Westbury, Wroxeter
| Shropshire, Powys
|-
! SY6
| CHURCH STRETTON
| Church Stretton, Cardington
| Shropshire
|-
!rowspan=3|SY7
| BUCKNELL
| Bucknell, Lingen, Munslow, Tugford
| rowspan=2|Shropshire, Herefordshire
|-
| CRAVEN ARMS
| Craven Arms, Clun Valley, Diddlebury, Leintwardine, Munslow, Tugford
|-
| LYDBURY NORTH
| Lydbury North
| Shropshire
|-
! SY8
| LUDLOW
| Ludlow, Brimfield, Clee Hill, Culmington, Leinthall Starkes, Richard's Castle, Stoke St. Milborough
| Shropshire, Herefordshire
|-
! SY9
| BISHOPS CASTLE
| Bishop's Castle, Wentnor
| Shropshire
|-
! SY10
| OSWESTRY
| Oswestry (outskirts), Gobowen, Llansilin, Llangedwyn, Llanrhaeadr-ym-Mochnant, Pen-y-bont-fawr, Llanwddyn
| Shropshire, Powys
|-
! SY11
| OSWESTRY
| Oswestry (most of), St Martin's, West Felton
| Shropshire
|-
! SY12
| ELLESMERE
| Ellesmere, Dudleston Heath (Criftins), Welshampton, Lyneal, Colemere, Cockshutt, English Frankton, Tetchill, Hordley, Bagley
| Shropshire
|-
! SY13
| WHITCHURCH
| Whitchurch, Whixall
| Shropshire
|-
! SY14
| MALPAS
| Malpas, Tilston, No Man's Heath, Bickley, Hampton, Shocklach, Bulkeley, Bickerton, Cuddington Heath, Cholmondeley, Threapwood, Barton, Duckington
| Cheshire West and Chester, Cheshire East, Wrexham
|-
! SY15
| MONTGOMERY
| Montgomery, Abermule, Chirbury, Church Stoke
| Powys, Shropshire
|-
! SY16
| NEWTOWN
| Newtown, Tregynon, Bettws Cedewain
| Powys
|-
!rowspan=2|SY17
| CAERSWS
| Caersws, Trefeglwys, Carno, Llanwnnog, Pontdolgoch, Clatter
|rowspan=2|Powys
|-
| LLANDINAM
| Llandinam
|-
! SY18
| LLANIDLOES
| Llanidloes, Llangurig, Van, Tylwch
| Powys
|-
! SY19
| LLANBRYNMAIR
| Llanbrynmair, Llan, Bont Dolgadfan, Dolfach, Talerddig, Staylittle, Pennant, Dylife
| Powys
|-
! SY20
| MACHYNLLETH
| Machynlleth, Corris
| Powys, Gwynedd
|-
! SY21
| WELSHPOOL
| Welshpool, Marton, Stockton
| Powys, Shropshire
|-
!rowspan=5|SY22
| LLANFECHAIN
| Llanfechain
|rowspan=5|Powys
|-
| LLANFYLLIN
| Llanfyllin
|-
| LLANSANTFFRAID
| Llansantffraid-ym-Mechain
|-
| LLANYMYNECH
| Llanymynech
|-
| MEIFOD
| Meifod
|-
!rowspan=3|SY23
| ABERYSTWYTH
| Aberystwyth, Llanbadarn Fawr, Penparcau
|rowspan=3|Ceredigion, Powys
|-
| LLANON
| Llanon
|-
| LLANRHYSTUD
| Llanrhystud
|-
!rowspan=3|SY24
| BORTH
| Borth
|rowspan=3|Ceredigion
|-
| BOW STREET
| Bow Street, Pen-y-garn, Rhydypennau, Llandre
|-
| TALYBONT
| Talybont
|-
!rowspan=2|SY25
| YSTRAD MEURIG
| Ystrad Meurig
|rowspan=2|Ceredigion, Powys
|-
| TREGARON
| Tregaron
|-
! style="background:#FFFFFF;"|SY99
| style="background:#FFFFFF;"|SHREWSBURY
| style="background:#FFFFFF;"|Jobcentre Plus
| style="background:#FFFFFF;"|non-geographic
|}

Map

See also
Postcode Address File
List of postcode areas in the United Kingdom

References

External links
Text to be displayedRoyal Mail's Postcode Address File
A quick introduction to Royal Mail's Postcode Address File (PAF)
Using Welsh alternative addresses within Royal Mail's Postcode Address File (PAF)

Postcode areas covering Wales
Shropshire
Postcode areas covering the West Midlands (region)